Roger Dale was the member of Parliament for Great Grimsby in 1414, 1416, and 1421.

References 

English MPs November 1414
Year of birth missing
Year of death missing
English MPs March 1416
Members of the Parliament of England for Great Grimsby
English MPs December 1421